Vellani is a surname. Notable people with the surname include:

Aliza Vellani (born 1991), Canadian actor
Francesco Vellani (1688–1768), Italian painter
Iman Vellani (born 2002), Canadian actress
Mario Vellani Marchi (1895–1979), Italian painter and scenic designer

See also
Villani